The production of Bhutan wine is reported to have first been attempted in the 1990s, with the introduction of an experimental vineyard at Paro near Thimpu, the capital of Bhutan. 
Australian wine company, Taltarni, is believed to have provided technical help, but it is not known whether any wine was successfully produced.

On April 2, 2019, the USA-based Bhutan Wine Company, in partnership with Bhutanese collaborators, planted the first fine wine vineyard in Bhutan: the Yusipang Vineyard. The first vine in the ground was Merlot.

On April 4, 2019, the Bhutan Wine Company planted a second small vineyard: the Bajo Vineyard. Varietals included Merlot, Cabernet, Cabernet Franc, Syrah, Pinot Noir, Chardonnay, Sauvignon Blanc, Malbec, and Petit Manseng. All vines came from Sunridge Nurseries in California.

April 8 & 10, 2019, the Bhutan Wine Company planted the Kingdom's third and fourth vineyards in Paro and Lingmethang.

As of May 11, 2019, an additional 2 acres had been cleared and planted at these initial vineyard sites.

References

Bhutanese culture
Wine by country